The Bernstein Land, also known as the Pełczyce Land, is a historical region in Western Pomerania in Central Europe, centered around the town of Pełczyce, Poland.

History 
The area was first settled between 1230 and 1240. The area used to be a part of Duchy of Pomerania and between 1279 to 1478, the ownership between the land has been changed between a few countries, to eventually become the part of Neumark, Margraviate of Brandenburg.

Symbols 
The coat of arms of the Bernstein Land is the escutcheon separated into two halves, with the upper half being red, and lower half, a blue and yellow (gold) checker. In the upper half is placed white (silver) upper half of a Griffin. The coat of arms has been used as the symbol of the Duchy of Pomerania-Wolgast.

Citations

Notes

References

Bibliography 
Encyklopedia Szczecina. vol. 1, A-O. Szczecin. University of Szczecin 1999. ISBN 83-87341-45-2.

Geography of West Pomeranian Voivodeship
Historical regions in Poland
Historical regions in Germany
History of Pomerania